The nagabon is a cross between a Scotch bonnet and a ghost pepper. Its heat is hotter than the hottest Scotch bonnet (750,000 SHU) and milder than the mildest naga (800,000 SHU).

References

Chili peppers